Pichatur is a village in Tirupati district of the Indian state of Andhra Pradesh. It is the mandal headquarters of Pitchatur mandal.

To reach near by places 

Pichatur which is a Part of the sacred Bharat continent, the elegant Telugu language and the pure Tamil language have mixed like milk and honey and these two language are spoken by the people. Also, It is central hot spot to reach very famous temples. The following information might be helpful.

Pichatur to Tirupati its 57 km distance by Road. The Venkateshwara Temple in the mountain town of Tirumala near in the city of Tirupati is one of the most important and most visited Hindu temples in India. It is dedicated to god Vishnu.

Pichatur to Narayanavanam its around 19 km distance by Road. The Temple is dedicated to Lord Kalyana Venkateswara, an incarnation of Vishnu. Lord Sri Venkateswara Swamy and Sri Padmavathi Ammavaru married here.

Pichatur to Nagalapuram its just 8 km distance by Road.This town is home to Vedanarayana Swamy temple, where the presiding deity Vishnu is in the form of Matsya, the first incarnation of Dasavatara.

Pichatur to srikalahasti its around 44 km distance by Road. vayu lingam (wind Lingam), One of the Panchabhootha Sthalams, god shiva worshipped as Kalahasteeswara. This temple is also regarded as Rahu-ketu kshetra and Dakshina kailasam.

Pichatur to Surutupalle its around 19 km distance by Road. God shiva worshipped as Pallikondeshwarudu. God shiva is in Sleeping posture on the lap of Parvati such unique posture is no where else in the world.

Pichatur to Periapalayam, Tamil Nadu. It is around 38 km distance by Road. Here, Sri Bhavani Amman located.

Pichatur to Tiruttani, Tamil Nadu . Its around 40 km distance by Road. This town is famous for Murugan Temple which is one of the Arupadaiveedu and is dedicated to the  Lord (Kartikeya) Murugan.

Pichatur to Chennai, Tamil Nadu. It is around 80 km distance by Road. It is biggest cultural and economic centre, earlier known as Madras.

References 

Villages in Tirupati district
Mandal headquarters in Tirupati district
Tirupati district